Machaeridia  is a genus of African grasshoppers in the subfamily Acridinae and tribe Pargaini.

Species
The Orthoptera Species File lists:
 Machaeridia bilineata Stål, 1873 - type species
 Machaeridia conspersa Bolívar, 1889

References

External Links 
 

Acrididae genera
Acridinae